The Castle Perilous series is a fantasy adventure series of novels written by John DeChancie, starting with the eponymous Castle Perilous in 1988. The most recent novel, The Pirates of Perilous was published in 2015, 19 years after the previous novel, Bride of the Castle.

Summary
The Castle Perilous series revolves around Castle Perilous (the name is drawn from the Siege Perilous of Arthurian fable), whose lord is Incarnadine, a sorcerer. 144,000 doors (or "aspects") of the Castle each lead to another parallel universe.  Some of these dimensions are magical, while others have little or no magic; one of the latter is Earth.  Those who find themselves at the Castle often stay to become residents, and (to their surprise) develop a magical power of their own.  This gift is apparently random, and can range from a minor telekinesis limited to lifting pencils to super-enhanced senses to teleportation to full conjuration of matter.

Characters
 Gene Ferraro: main character, a philosophy major from Earth  who gains the power of superb swordplay
 Snowclaw: a giant humanoid covered in white fur, who originally comes from a polar-like clime
 Linda Barclay: a woman from Earth who becomes a powerful sorceress
 Lord Incarnadine: sorcerer and lord of the castle
 Kwip: a lifelong thief who escaped execution by accidentally walking into the Castle through a doorway in his cell
 Cleve Dalton: a mild-mannered retiree
 Peter Thaxton: elder Englishman who is competitive in sports
 Osmirik: royal scribe and librarian of the Castle
 Sheila Jankowski: a young woman from Wilmerding, Pennsylvania who fell through an aspect of the Castle in her shower
 Jeremy Hochstader: a computer hacker
 M. DuQuesne: a French nobleman

Novels
 Castle Perilous (1988)
 Castle for Rent (1989)
 Castle Kidnapped (1989)
 Castle War! (1990)
 Castle Murders (1991)
 Castle Dreams (1992)
 Castle Spellbound (1992)
 Bride of the Castle (1994)
 The Pirates of Perilous (2015)

External links
 Official bibliography of John DeChancie

Novels about parallel universes
American fantasy novel series